Sir Baddeley Devesi  (October 16, 1939 – February 16, 2012) was a Solomon Islander politician who served as the first Governor-General of the Solomon Islands for two consecutive terms.

He was born in Guadalcanal. He served as the first Governor-General of the Solomon Islands from July 7, 1978 to July 7, 1988. Later, he served as Foreign Minister from 1989 to 1990, Interior Minister from 1990 to 1992, and Deputy Prime Minister from 1990 to 1993 and 1997 to 2000, until the government was removed by a coup d'etat.

As a leader during the independence, he criticized Britain for its lack of preparation for the handover of autonomy, which ultimately led to the political crises the Solomons have suffered following independence. He quipped that "the empire was leaving behind a system of British justice and Parliament, but for an island nation with 4 volcanoes and 70 languages." In particular he was concerned about the absence of preparation for economic development.

In 1993, he addressed the United Nations General Assembly with concerns that the United Nations Framework Convention on Climate Change did not sufficiently address the issue of global warming. He was also a strong advocate of the Treaty of Rarotonga.

Leading up to the coup, he had strongly recommended to the Australian and New Zealand High Commissioner that they send peacekeepers. He encouraged election observers to ensure an orderly formation of a government after the 2006 election.

Baddeley was also, briefly, a teacher and acting head teacher at the Diocese of Melanesia (Anglican) Vera'na'aso Primary School, Maravovo during 1966–67. He died on 16 February 2012, aged 72.

References

External links
 Biography of Sir Baddeley on the Solomon Star newspaper website.

1939 births
Governors-General of Solomon Islands
Leaders of the Opposition (Solomon Islands)
Members of the National Parliament of the Solomon Islands
People from Guadalcanal Province
Knights Grand Cross of the Order of St Michael and St George
Knights Grand Cross of the Royal Victorian Order
2012 deaths
Foreign Ministers of the Solomon Islands
Health ministers of the Solomon Islands
Communication ministers of the Solomon Islands
Transport ministers of the Solomon Islands
Deputy Prime Ministers of the Solomon Islands